Adam Gee (born 22 October 1980) is an English professional golfer.

Amateur career
Gee was born in Carshalton, England. He was a relative latecomer to golf, not attempting the game for the first time until the age of 15. Despite this, he earned a golf scholarship to the University of North Carolina Wilmington, but opted to take a role as a club assistant on his return as he doubted his ability to compete as a professional. Gee finished runner-up at the 2006 Amateur Championship.

Professional career
Gee eventually turned professional at the late age of 26, and began his career on the second-tier Challenge Tour. After four consistent seasons at this level, finishing between 40th and 65th every year, he came through the qualifying school at the end of 2010 to earn a position on the European Tour for 2011.

Gee pioneered a system of obtaining financial backing by offering rewards to members of the public in return for small donations. He has also written a regular blog for the Sky Sports website.

Amateur wins
2002 Tillman Trophy
2005 Berkshire Trophy
2006 Lake Macquarie Amateur

See also
2010 European Tour Qualifying School graduates
2013 European Tour Qualifying School graduates

References

External links

English male golfers
European Tour golfers
People from Carshalton
Golfers from London
1980 births
Living people